Premante Idera is 1998 Indian Telugu-language romantic drama film directed by Jayanth C. Paranjee, and produced by Burugupalli Siva Rama Krishna  and K. Ashok Kumar under the Sri Lakshmi Venteswara Art Films banner. The film stars Venkatesh and Preity Zinta (in her Telugu film debut), with music composed by Ramana Gogula, in his first composition.

The film won Nandi Award for Best Cinematographer (Jayanan Vincent). It was remade in Kannada as O Premave with Ravichandran.

Plot
Murali  and his friends go to a village to attend their friend's marriage. There Murali meets a girl Shailu, the bridegroom's friend, they begin to have fun and join in with the festivities and Murali is captivated by her attitude and beauty. Soon both fall in love, but Murali soon finds out that she is to be married to a police officer Muralidhar.

Murali puts on a brave face for the ceremony but hopes that something or someone will be able to stop the ceremony. He does everything he can to stop the marriage, he even tries to convince Shailu's joint family. Finally, the movie ends with the approval of Venktramayya for their marriage.

Cast

 Venkatesh as Murali
 Preity Zinta as Shailaja "Shailu" (Voice dubbed by Shilpa)
 Ranganath as Venkatramayya 
 Satyanarayana as Shailu's grandfather 
 Srihari as Muralidhar 
 Brahmanandam as Avadhani
 Ali as Ram Pandu
 Chandra Mohan as Subba Rao 
 Giri Babu as Murali's father
 Prasad Babu as Suryam
 Narra Venkateswara Rao as Satyam's father 
 Raghunatha Reddy as Murali's Uncle
 Maharshi Raghava  as Murali's brother
 Sivaji Raja as Satyam 
 Sivaji as Sivaji
 Prasanna Kumar 
 Naveen as Sarath
 Gadiraju Subba Rao
 Lakshmi as Murali's mother
 Rama Prabha as Subbammatta
 Sana as Shailu's aunty
 Rajitha as Shailu's aunty
 Bangalore Padma as Satyam's mother
 Madhurima Sundersen as Lakshmi
 Harika as Murali's sister-in-law
 Neelima 
 Tarangini as Shailu's friend 
 Madhu Mani as Shailu's friend
 Vajja Venkata Giridhar as Murali's friend

Soundtrack

Music composed by Ramana Gogula. Music released on ADITYA Music Company.

Tamil — Dubbed Version (as Naesikkiren)

Hindi — Dubbed Version (as Dulhan Dilwale Ki)

Box office 
Rakesh P of Deccan Herald called the storyline "trite", but the film "still manages to capture young hearts, for it`s shot in a free-wheeling and fluid fashion". The film had collected a distributors' share of Rs.85 million in its complete theatrical run.

Awards 
 1998: Nandi Award for Best Cinematographer - Jayanan Vincent

References

External links
 

1990s Telugu-language films
1998 films
1998 romantic drama films
Films directed by Jayanth C. Paranjee
Indian romantic drama films
Telugu films remade in other languages